The University of São Tomé and Príncipe, USTP, is a public institution of higher education in São Tomé and Príncipe. It is the main institution dedicated to teaching, research and university extension of the country. It was established in 2014 by merging three older institutions of higher education: ISP (Instituto Superior Politécnico de São Tomé e Príncipe, also ISPSTP), EFOPE (Escola de Formação de Professores e Educadores) and ICS (Instituto de Ciências de Saúde).

History 
The polytechnical school ISP was founded in 1996 through Decree 88, under the name "Higher Polytechnic Institute of São Tomé and Príncipe" (ISPSTP, in Portuguese); it began operations in the academic year 1997/1998. Under the auspices of the Ministry of Education and Culture, ISPSTP began its activities with three-year baccalaureate courses aimed at training secondary school teachers in the areas of Portuguese, French, Mathematics, Biology and History. Other baccalaureate courses were created later.

The predecessor of the medical school ICS, Escola de Formação dos Quadros da Saúde Dr. Victor Sá Machado, was established in 2003 with financial support from the Calouste Gulbenkian Foundation, and was inaugurated in October 2003. In 2014 it was renamed Instituto Superior de Ciências da Saúde Victor Sá Machado.

On July 24, 2014, the government of São Tomé and Príncipe decided to establish the "São Tomé and Príncipe Public University" (UPSTP). For that, they converted the ISPSTP (transforming into an organic institution), creating instead the first public university of the archipelago. At the installation ceremony, the Minister of Education, Culture and Formation, Jorge Lopes Bom Jesus, installed the university professor Peregrino do Sacramento da Costa, as the Rector of the new university.

Two Brazilian institutions have supported the project since its inception in 2012: the University for International Integration of the Afro-Brazilian Lusophony (Unilab) and the Federal University of Minas Gerais (UFMG). Both universities, together with the Brazilian Ministry of Education are assisting the institution until its final consolidation. In September 2015, the creation of a German course was announced at the UPSTP with the support of the Goethe Institute and the German Academy Exchange Service and in collaboration of the University of Münster. In 2016 the university changed its name to "Universidade de São Tomé e Príncipe" (USTP). On July 28, 2016, the new rector, Professor Ayres Bruzaca de Menezes, took office.

Departments and courses

The University of São Tomé and Príncipe covers the following scientific areas:
 Sciences of Nature, Life and Environment
 Human and Social Sciences and Arts
 Exact Sciences and Engineering
 Economic and Political Sciences and Law

It offers the following courses:
Human and Social Sciences and Arts, Exact Sciences and Engineering

Licentiate in Biology
Licentiate in Mathematics
Licentiate in Agronomy
Licentiate in Physics
Licentiate in Business Administration
Licentiate in Public Relations and Communications
Licentiate in Economics
Licentiate in Hotel Management
Licentiate in Computer Engineering
Licentiate in Electronic Engineering and Telecommunications
Licentiate in Systems and Information Technology
Licentiate in the Portuguese language
Licentiate in History
Licentiate in the French language
Licentiate in Geography
Licentiate in Law

Health Sciences

Licentiate in management administration in health services
Bachelor in Nursing
Bachelor in Clinical Analysis
Bachelor in Anesthesia
Complement on the secondary education in pharmacy
Middle courses on nursing
Middle courses on maternal and child health
Specialization in surgical instrumentation 

Education

Licentiate in Primary Education, Initial Training
Complement of Licentiate in Primary Education
Bachelor in Primary Education
Bachelor in Children's Education

Notable alumni and professor
Claudio Corallo - former professor, agronomical engineer and businessman
Guadalupe de Ceita (alumnus of the former School of Nursing) - medic and politician
Jorge Bom Jesus (alumnus and former professor) - linguist and politician.

Rectors

References

External links
Instituto Superior Politécnico site in Portuguese
University of São Tomé and Príncipe site in Portuguese

 
Buildings and structures in São Tomé
2014 establishments in São Tomé and Príncipe
Educational institutions established in 2014